This is a list of manufacturers of flash memory controllers for various flash memory devices like SSDs, USB flash drives, SD cards, and CompactFlash cards.

List

Note: Independent=sells to any 3rd party; Captive=only used for their own products

Largest NAND flash memory manufacturers
The following are the largest NAND flash memory manufacturers, as of the first quarter of 2019.

Samsung  29.9%
Kioxia (formerly Toshiba)  20.2%
Micron Technology (Crucial)  16.5%
Western Digital (SanDisk)  14.9%
SK Hynix (Klevv)  9.5%
Intel  8.5%

See also
 Flash memory
 History of hard disk drives
 List of defunct hard disk manufacturers
 List of solid-state drive manufacturers

References

 
Flash memory controller manufacturers
Flash memory controller
Manufacturers